Septoria fragariaecola is a fungal plant pathogen infecting strawberries.

References

External links

Fungi described in 1928
Fungal strawberry diseases
fragariaecola